Normand Roger (born 1949 in Montreal, Quebec) is a Canadian composer, sound editor and sound designer. He is particularly known for his work as a composer of soundtracks for animated films, having composed more than 200 such works since 1970. He has also worked on the creation of music for documentaries, feature films, television dramas, children's series, commercials, and new technologies with 3D and virtual reality. He is the composer of many original soundtracks for Frédéric Back, Paul Driessen, Michaël Dudok de Wit, Caroline Leaf and Aleksandr Petrov. Thirteen of his works have been nominated for Academy Awards, of which six have won. He also notably wrote the theme for the PBS's Mystery!. Roger lectures throughout the world on music and sound for animation.

Roger has spent nearly 40 years creating soundtracks for the National Film Board of Canada (NFB) in his hometown of Montreal, after first being hired for its animation department at the age of 22. His extensive NFB credits include Every Child and The Sand Castle, both winners of the Academy Award for Best Animated Short Film.

He is married to animation film director and producer Marcy Page, whom he met while working with on her film, Paradisia.

Filmography
 1977  The Sand Castle
 1979	Every Child - (Sound, sound designer)
 1980  Mystery! - (Composer, opening and closing theme)
 1980	The Sweater - (Composer, music score, sound editor)	
 1981	The Tender Tale of Cinderella Penguin - (Sound, sound designer)
 1981  Crac
 1987  The Man Who Planted Trees
 1988  The Dingles - (Composer, sound editor)
 1992	No Problem - (Composer)	
 1995	The Champagne Safari - (Composer)
 1996	How Wings Are Attached to the Backs of Angels (Composer)
 1996	Shyness - (Composer, sound editor)	
 1999	The Old Man And The Sea - (Composer)	
 2000  Father and Daughter - (Music score)
 2010  Glimpses/Impressions  - (Music score)

References

External links

Filmography at the National Film Board of Canada

1949 births
Living people
Canadian film score composers
Male film score composers
French Quebecers
National Film Board of Canada people
Animation composers
Musicians from Montreal
Canadian sound designers